The Shubert family was responsible for the establishment of the Broadway district, in New York City, as the hub of the theatre industry in the United States. They dominated the legitimate theater and vaudeville in the first half of the 20th century, promoting entertainment attuned to the popular taste.

History
The family's American history began when Duvvid Schubart (transliterated to "Shubert") and his wife Katrina (Gitel)  Helwitz left their native town Vladislavov in the Russian Empire (now Kudirkos Naumiestis, Lithuania) with their eight children, two of whom died after the journey. They arrived in New York City from Hamburg, via England, on June 12, 1881 on the s/s Spain. They then settled in Syracuse, New York.

The three Shubert sons (Lee Shubert, Sam S. Shubert, and Jacob J. Shubert) had to give up much of their formal education and instead work when they were very young. After being introduced to the world of theatre, the three brothers broke the monopoly on the theatre-management industry (represented by the Theatrical Syndicate under Abe Erlanger and Mark Klaw) in the foundation of a rival agency, the Shubert Organization,.

Among the organization's Manhattan holdings are the renowned Winter Garden Theatre (at 1634 Broadway), the Sam S. Shubert (at 221 West 44th Street), and the Imperial Theatres. By 1924, they had 86 theatres in the United States. By 1953, they had produced 600 shows under their credits and had booked 1,000 shows into their numerous theatres. By the 1920s, they owned, operated, managed or booked over 1,000 theatres nationwide. 
  
In 1942, they owned, leased or managed 20 of New York City's approximately 40 legitimate theatres and controlled some 15 in other cities. As of 2009, the Shubert Organization owns seventeen Broadway theatres in New York City, as well as the Shubert Theatre in Boston, the Forrest Theatre in Philadelphia, and manages the National Theatre in Washington, D.C. The organization also owns and operates the 5-stage Off-Broadway facility, New World Stages.

Jerry Stagg identifies Lee Shubert as the key creative partner, showing how he built the most successful theatrical empire in history. Stagg characterizes the trio as vulgar and uneducated, but acknowledges that they made a personal monopoly amassing millions of profits in the process. They opened new theater districts in many major American cities, employing thousands over the years. Entertainment and popular taste was the goal, rather than the dramatic arts.  By 1924, they controlled 75 percent of all American theaters, producing 25 percent of all plays. Their actors in response created Actor's Equity as a labor union to counterbalance their power. When the Great Depression caused the bankruptcy of their corporate empire in 1933, they could have retired wealthy. Instead they  kept the theater alive pouring their own money into the gamble. Almost alone they kept the legitimate theater alive in America. The federal government called them a monopoly, and in 1950 they were taken to court by the federal government. In 1955, a U.S. Supreme Court ruling ruled that they were subject to antitrust laws, so they sold 12 theaters in six cities and gave up the booking business, the heart of their enterprise.

Notable productions

Musical comedies 
Chinese Honeymoon (1902)
Winsome Winnie (1903)
The Babes and the Baron (1905)
The Dancing Duchess (1914)

Revues 
Pioneer Days (1906) featuring Indians, cavalry, baby elephants, and chorus girls, directed by Lee Shubert
The Passing Show (1912–24), annual musical revue, rivaling Florenz Ziegfeld's Follies.

Operettas 
The Blue Paradise (1915), and other Sigmund Romberg musicals

Family
The Shubert children:
Lee Shubert  (1871–1953), theatre owner/operator, producer. Married to Marcella Swanson (1900-1973). No children. 
Fannie Shubert (1868-1928). From her first marriage to Isaac Isaacs she had three sons: Jesse Isaacs (1893-1904), Larry Shubert (1894-1965) and Milton Isaacs Shubert (1901-1967). Her second husband was William Weissager. 
Sarah Shubert (1870–1934). Married to Edward Davidow. No children. 
Sam S. Shubert  (1874–1905), producer, writer, director, theatre owner/operator; died in a Pennsylvania train accident
Jacob J. Shubert  (1876–1963), producer, director, theatre owner/operator. From his first marriage to Catherine Dealy he had a son John Jason Shubert (1908-1962).
Dora (Debora) Shubert (1880–1951). From her marriage to Milton Wolf (1881-1955) she had a daughter Sylvia Wolf Golde (1910–1981)

See also
 The Shubert Organization

References

Further reading
 Chach, Maryann. Shuberts present, one hundred years of great American theater (Harry N. Abrams, 2001).
 Hirsch, Foster. The Boys from Syracuse: The Shuberts' Theatrical Empire (Cooper Square Press, 2000).
 Liebling, A.J. Profile, 1939. The Boys from Syracuse. The New Yorker 
 McNamara, Brooks. The Shuberts of Broadway: a history drawn from the collections of the Shubert Archive (Oxford University Press, 1990).
 Poggi, Jack. Theatre in America--The Impact of Economic Forces, 1870-1967 (1968) 
 Sanjek, Russell. American popular music and its business: From 1900 to 1984 (3 vol. Oxford UP, 1988).
 Stagg, Jerry. Brothers Shubert (Ballantine Books, 1968)  
 Westover, Jonas.   The Shuberts and Their Passing Shows: The Untold Tale of Ziegfeld's Rivals (Oxford University Press,  2017)
 Vickery, Anthony. "Did the Shuberts Save Broadway? The Corporate Producers." in The Palgrave Handbook of Musical Theatre Producers ed. by Laura MacDonald and William  Everett,  (Palgrave Macmillan, 2017) pp. 69–82.
 "Shubert Brothers" in Encyclopedia of World Biography (Gale, 1998) online

External links
 
  Shubert Foundation biography
  Shubert Archive

American theatre managers and producers
Business families of the United States
Jewish-American families
Lithuanian Jews
Shubert Organization
Businesspeople from Syracuse, New York